Dendrolaelaps casualis is a species of mite first found in Finland.

References

Digamasellidae
Animals described in 2010